Høgronden is a mountain in Folldal Municipality in Innlandet county, Norway. The mountain lies east of Midtronden and Digerronden, northeast of Rondeslottet and Vinjeronden, north of Rondvasshøgde, and northwest of Veslsvulten. Norwegian County Road 27 passes by the mountain to the east.

Name
The last part of the name comes from the word  which was probably the original name of the nearby lake Rondvatnet. Many of the mountains near the lake were then named after this lake.

See also
List of mountains of Norway

References

Mountains of Innlandet
Folldal